Atenógenes Silva y Álvarez Tostado (22 August 1848 – 26 February 1911) was a Mexican clergyman,  Bishop of Colima (1892–1900), and Archbishop of Morelia (1900–1911).

Biography 
He was the son of Joaquín Silva (of Portuguese origin) and Ignacia Álvarez Tostado (born in Tlajomulco de Zúñiga). He was ordained a priest on 30 November 1871 in the Parish of the Sanctuary of Guadalajara. He obtained a doctorate in Theology from the Pontifical Academy of Guadalajara.

At twenty-five years of age, he was a priest in the Diocese of Ciudad Guzmán, where he founded an observatory. In 1880 he was appointed parish priest of the same diocese. In 1883, he was a prebendary in the Cathedral of Guadalajara, during his canonry he founded welfare homes and some other religious institutions. He was a professor at his alma mater.

In that archdiocese, he founded the hospital of the Congregation of the Sisters of the Sacred Heart and the Poor, also known as Hospital of the Sacred Heart of Jesus.

On 11 July 1892, Pope Leo XIII named him Bishop of Colima; on 9 October of the same year he was consecrated by the hands of Archbishop Pedro Loza y Pardavé. On August 21, 1900 he was named Archbishop of Morelia; in this archdiocese he founded schools which he provided with libraries and laboratories.

For his work he was known as the "Father of the Poor". He was decorated with the great cross of the Order of Isabella the Catholic. On 1 January 1900, he was elected a corresponding member of the Mexican Academy of Language. He died at the age of 62, on 26 February 1911, in Morelia.

References

External links 
Guisa y Azevedo, Jesús Centenarios. Humanistas Mexicanos. Atenógenes Silva y Álvarez Tostado.

1848 births
1911 deaths
People from Guadalajara, Jalisco
Bishops in Mexico
19th-century Roman Catholic bishops in Mexico
20th-century Roman Catholic archbishops in Mexico
Roman Catholic archbishops of Morelia